The African diaspora in the Americas refers to the people born in the Americas with partial, predominant, or complete sub-Saharan African ancestry. Many are descendants of persons enslaved in Africa and transferred to the Americas by Europeans, then forced to work mostly in European-owned mines and plantations, between the sixteenth and nineteenth centuries.

History

After the United States achieved independence, next came the independence of Haiti, a country populated almost entirely by people of African descent and the second American colony to win its independence from European colonial powers. After the process of independence, many countries have encouraged European immigration to America, thus reducing the proportion of black and mulatto population throughout the country: Brazil, the United States, and the Dominican Republic. Miscegenation and more flexible concepts of race have also reduced the overall population identifying as black in Latin America, whereas the one-drop rule in the United States has had the opposite effect.

From 21 to 25 November 1995, the Continental Congress of Black Peoples of the Americas was held. Black people still face discrimination in most parts of the continent. According to David D.E. Ferrari, vice president of the World Bank for the Region of Latin America and the Caribbean, black people have lower life expectancy, higher infant mortality, more frequent and more widespread diseases, higher rates of illiteracy and lower income than Americans of different ethnic origin. Women, also the subjects of gender discrimination, suffer worse living conditions.

Today
In Brazil, with 6.9% of phenotypically Black population and 43.8% of pardo (mestizo), poverty is common. It is nevertheless important to note that the´Pardo category includes all mulattoes, zambos and the result of their intermixing with other groups, but it is majority of European descent, with most White Brazilians having at least one recent African and/or Native American ancestor and Pardos also being caboclos, descendants of Whites and Amerindians, or mestizos. There are more definitions of the differences and social disparity between blacks and "non-white or pardo" than whites in Brazil in the Black people article section.

According to various studies, the main genetic contribution to Brazilians is European (always above 65%, and an American study found it as high as 77%), and Pardos possess a higher degree of African descent when compared to the general White Brazilian and African-Brazilian populations (the previous mostly with some detectable non-white ancestor and the latter highly miscegenated) and exhibit a greater Amerindian contribution in areas such as the Amazon Basin and a stronger African contribution in the areas of historical slavery such as Southeastern Brazil and coastal Northeastern cities, nevertheless both are present in all regions, and that physical features did much correlate with detectable ancestry in many instances.

On 4 November 2008, the first mulatto U.S. president, Barack Obama, won 52% of the vote.  His father was an African man from Kenya and his mother a white woman from Kansas.

Table

Notable people of African descent in the Americas 

 Charlie Davies, American football player
 Hayden Knight, American football player
Kareem Abdul-Jabbar – American basketball player
Archie Alleyne – Canadian musician 
Deandre Ayton – Bahamian basketball player
Ronald Acuna Jr. – Venezuelan baseball player
Ozzie Albies – Curaçaoan baseball player
Laz Alonso – Cuban actor
Edem Awumey – Canadian writer
Susana Baca – Peruvian musician 
Leandro Barbosa – Brazilian basketball player
Charles Barkley – American basketball player
RJ Barrett – Canadian basketball player
Abelardo Barroso – Cuban singer
Mario Bazán – Peruvian athlete 
DaMarcus Beasley – American football player
Jean Beausejour – Chilean football player
Adrián Beltré – Dominican baseball player
Halle Berry – American actress
Beyoncé – American singer
Usain Bolt – Jamaican sprinter
Cory Booker – American politician
E. R. Braithwaite – Guyanese writer, educator and diplomat
Melvin Brown – Mexican football player
Rudel Calero – Nicaraguan football player
Mariah Carey – American singer
Ramiro Castillo – Bolivian football player
Aimé Césaire – Martinican author, philosopher and politician
Bill Cosby – American actor and comedian
Celia Cruz – Cuban singer
Teófilo Cubillas – Peruvian football player
Stephen Curry – American basketball player
Edwidge Danticat – Haitian-American author 
Oscar D'León – Venezuelan musician
Giovani dos Santos – Mexican football player
Drake – Canadian rapper
Tim Duncan – American basketball player
Kevin Durant – American basketball player
Giovanny Espinoza – Ecuadorian football player
Patrick Ewing – Jamaican basketball player
Frantz Fanon – Martinican philosopher and Pan-Africanist
Jefferson Farfán – Peruvian football player
Marcus Garvey – Jamaican Pan-Africanist
Juan José Nieto Gil – Colombian president 
Edray H. Goins – African American president of the National Association of Mathematicians (NAM)
Eddy Grant – Guyanese pop and reggae music star
Kevin Hanchard – Canadian actor
Devern Hansack – Nicaraguan baseball pitcher
James Harden – American basketball player
Kamala Harris – American politician, Vice President of the United States
Wilson Harris – Guyanese writer
Buddy Hield – Bahamian basketball player
Kyrie Irving – American basketball player
Michael Jackson – American singer
Janet Jackson – American singer
Lamar Jackson – American football player
C. L. R. James – Trinidadian historian and academic 
LeBron James – American basketball player
Wyclef Jean – Haitian musician 
Dwayne Johnson – American actor and wrestler
Magic Johnson – American basketball player
Michael Jordan – American basketball player
Colin Kaepernick – American civil rights activist and American football player
Martin Luther King Jr. – American civil rights activist
Don Lemon – American journalist
Mia Love – American politician 
Malcolm X – American human rights activist 
Bob Marley – Jamaican reggae musician
Jackson Martínez – Colombian football player
Margareth Menezes – Brazilian singer
Zezé Motta – Brazilian actress
Morella Muñoz – Venezuelan singer
Anthony Nesty – Surinamese swimmer
Lupita Nyong'o – Mexican actress
Barack Obama – American politician, first black president of the United States 
Michelle Obama – American politician, former First Lady of the United States 
Shaquille O'Neal – American basketball player
David Ortiz – Dominican baseball player
Deval Patrick – American politician
Chris Paul – American basketball player
Carlos Posadas – Argentine musician
Álex Quiñónez – Ecuadorian Olympic sprinter
Rubén Rada – Uruguayan singer
Lionel Richie – American singer
Robinho – Brazilian football player
Walter Rodney – Guyanese historian and political activist
Arturo Rodríguez – Argentine boxer
Bill Russell – American basketball player
Carlos Andrés Sánchez – Uruguayan football player
 Jerry Jeudy, American football player
Pablo Sandoval – Venezuelan athlete 
Tupac Shakur – American rapper
Cayetano Alberto Silva – Uruguayan musician
Will Smith – American actor and singer
Domingo Sosa – Argentine soldier
Sloane Stephens – American tennis player
María Isabel Urrutia – Colombian athlete
Bebo Valdés – Cuban pianist
Elcina Valencia – Colombian teacher
Dwyane Wade – American basketball player
Derek Walcott – Saint Lucian poet, playwright and the 1992 Nobel Prize Literature Winner
Denzel Washington – American actor
The Weeknd – Canadian singer
Kanye West – American singer
Russell Westbrook – American basketball player
Andrew Wiggins – Canadian basketball player
Eric Eustace Williams – Trinidad and Tobago's first Prime Minister
Serena Williams – American tennis player
Zion Williamson – American basketball player
Russell Wilson – American football player
Tiger Woods – American golfer

Related bibliography 
 Ethnic domination and racist discourse in Spain and Latin America. Dijk, Teun A. van. van. Gedisa Editorial SA 
 Gender, class and race in Latin America: some contributions. Luna, Lola G. Ed PPU, SA 
 Gender, race and class "color" desensientes Latinas. Impoexports, Colombia, Yumbo
 Afro Atlantic Histories resource, National Gallery of Art, Washington DC.

See also
African-Latin American
African-Caribbean

References

 
 
Ethnic groups in the Americas
People of African descent
Slavery in North America
Slavery in South America